Arkonips is a Devonian polychaete known from the pyritized specimens in the Hungry Hollow Formation of Ontario, Canada.

References

Phyllodocida